Serhiy Vladyslavovych Fedorov (born 18 February 1975 in Kyiv) is a Ukrainian football manager and former player. He started off as a central defender, but mostly plays as a right back, or a right-sided midfielder. He subsequently started a managering career.

Career
Fedorov came through the youth ranks at Dynamo and his first coaches were Hryhoriy Matiyenko and Anatoliy Kroshchenko. Fedorov made his professional debut in 1992 playing for Dynamo-2 Kyiv in a home game against Halychyna Drohobych. In a spring of 1993 he spend some time playing for CSK ZSU at the third tier. He finally made his debut for the Dynamo's fist team at the top tier on 12 March 1994 playing an away match against Tavriya Simferopol.

He has been a reliable performer all across the defence, without ever quite making any position his own. Due to limited opportunities, he was given to the UPL newcomer CSKA-Borysfen Kyiv (later CSKA) in 1995 playing for the club for a year and half and finally gaining some game time at the top level. 

In 1997 Fedorov returned to Dynamo. After his return, it was not until 2001 when he finally earned a regular spot in the first squad. In 1997–2001 Fedorov more often was featured in matches for Dynamo-2 at the second tier. At international club level, he made his debut at the 1998–99 UEFA Champions League in the away match against Barry Town F.C. on 29 July 1998, yet more play time he got next season in 1999–2000. During the 2003–04 UEFA Champions League Fedorov managed to score two goals, one Dinamo Zagreb and another one Inter Milan. He also was featured in two Ukrainian Super Cup in 2004 and 2005 and winning the one in 2004. Fedorov also made appearances in four final matches of the Ukrainian Cup.

He was released as a free agent in 2008, and on 1 April 2009 he joined FC Chornomorets Odesa for the remainder of 2008–09 season.

In contrast to his underrated Dynamo career, he has been a regular for his country, Ukraine in their various qualifying campaigns throughout the 1990s and 2000s, and was set to take part in the 2006 World Cup in Germany. Serhiy suffered an injury prior to the event, and was then replaced by Oleksandr Yatsenko from U-21 Team.

Honours 
 Ukrainian Premier League: 1997–98, 1998–99, 1999–00, 2000–2001, 2006–07
 Ukrainian First League: 1998–99, 1999–00, 2000–2001
 Ukrainian Cup: 1998, 1999, 2000, 2006, 2007
 Ukrainian Super Cup: 2004

References

External links
Profile on Chornomorets' official website

1975 births
Living people
Footballers from Kyiv
Ukrainian footballers
Ukraine international footballers
Ukraine under-21 international footballers
Ukrainian Premier League players
FC Dynamo Kyiv players
FC Dynamo-2 Kyiv players
FC Dynamo-3 Kyiv players
FC Chornomorets Odesa players
FC Arsenal Kyiv players
FC CSKA Kyiv players
Ukrainian football managers
Association football defenders
FC Dynamo Kyiv non-playing staff